Called together in the Sudan by Hassan al-Turabi, the 1991 Popular Arab and Islamic Congress Conference sought to unify Mujahideen and other Islamic elements in the wake of the Soviet withdrawal from Afghanistan and the Iraqi defeat in the Gulf War. It sought to provide an alternative to the Saudi-dominated Organization of the Islamic Conference, although it did not have its financial means.

Held from April 25–28, it brought together disparate sections of the Muslim world in an attempt at Pan-Arabism and Pan-Islamic union. It was estimated to have brought together 500 people, from 45 nations. The congress met again in December 1993 and had a third meeting in March–April 1995.

It has been suggested that al-Turabi hoped to "crystallize discontent in the Arab world by bringing together under a single banner, hardline Islamic militants and nationalists". Critics suggested the congress also had domestic purposes for al-Turabi and his regime, particularly the "strengthening" of "his hold" on Sudan by posing as a leader of "the progressive Muslim masses", and the regime's "masking" its "narrow origins" and "lack of mass support".

In attendance
Hassan al-Turabi, Secretary-General of the Conference
Ibrahim al-Sanoussi, Deputy Secretary-General
Osama bin Laden
Ayman al-Zawahiri of Egyptian Islamic Jihad
Ali Mahdi of Somalia
Sa'ad al-Tikriti, son of Iraqi Mukhabarat director Sabawi Ibrahim al-Tikriti
Abdallah Fadil, Iraqi minister of religious endowments 
Abdul-Latif Arabiyat, Speaker of the House of Representatives of Jordan
Yasser Arafat, leader of the PLO
Mounir Shafiq, General Director of the PLO Planning Center.
Nayef Hawatmeh, leader of the DFLP
George Habash, leader of the PFLP
Hamas members Khaled Mashal, Ibrahim Ghousha and Munir Said
Fathi Shaqaqi, founder of Palestinian Islamic Jihad
Jabbar Amar, member of Palestinian Islamic Jihad
Imad Mughniyah of Hezbollah
Rached Ghannouchi, founder of al-Nahda of Tunisia
Abdul Majeed al-Zindani, founder of Yemen's Al-Islah party
Mohammed Jamal Khalifa, founder of the Philippine branch of Benevolence International, brother-in-law to Osama bin Laden, representing Abu Sayyaf
Gulbuddin Hekmatyar, leader of Hezb-i-Islami of Afghanistan
Abdul Rasul Sayyaf, leader of the Istehar-i-Islami of Afghanistan
Abbassi Madani, founder of the Islamic Salvation Front of Algeria
Ibrahim Shukri, Ma'mun al-Hudaybi, and Mustafa Mashhur of the Muslim Brotherhood in Egypt
Mohammed Abdul Rahman al-Khalifa, leader of the Jordanian Muslim Brotherhood
Adnan Saad al-Din, leader of a faction of the Syrian Muslim Brotherhood
Mubarak Ali Gilani, founder of Jamaat ul-Fuqra, named as a delegate from Kashmiri Hizb al-Mujahideen
Muhammad Ahmad Al-Sharif, leader of the World Islamic Call Society of Libya 
Qazi Hussain Ahmad, leader of Jama'at-e Islami
Daud Musa Pidcock, founder of the Islamic Party of Britain
Abdel Bari Atwan, publisher of Al-Quds Al-Arabi
Carlos the Jackal
Abu Nidal
Geydar Dzhemal
Commanders of Al-Gama'a al-Islamiyya
Members of the Iranian Revolutionary Guard
Members of the Iranian MOIS
Members of Afghan Jamiat-e Islami
Members of Pakistani Jama'at-e Islami
Members of Eritrean Islamic Jihad
Members of the Oromo Liberation Front
Members of the Lebanese Muslim Brotherhood
Delegates from the Iraqi Trade Union
Delegates from the Libyan Arab Jamahiriya

See also
Al-Qaeda
Arab League
Foreign relations of Sudan
Muslim Brotherhood
National Islamic Front

References

1991 conferences
1991 in Sudan
1993 conferences
1993 in Sudan
1995 conferences
1995 in Sudan
Arab nationalism in Sudan
History of Sudan
International conferences
Pan-Arabism
Pan-Islamism
Political conferences
Islamic conferences